Sheikh Jamal Stadium is a cricket and football stadium in Faridpur, Bangladesh. It has hosted first class and list A cricket since 2000.

See also
 Stadiums in Bangladesh
 Tangail Stadium
 List of cricket grounds in Bangladesh

References

Cricket grounds in Bangladesh
Football venues in Bangladesh
Sheikh Jamal Dhanmondi Club